The Giardino Botanico "Loreto Grande" is a small botanical garden located in the Parco Nazionale d'Abruzzo, Lazio e Molise, in the commune of Villavallelonga, province of L'Aquila, Abruzzo, Italy.

The garden was established in 1984 and named in honor of botanist  Loreto Grande. It contains maple, beech, hazels, black hornbeam, and wild roses.

See also 
 List of botanical gardens in Italy

External links
 Villavallelonga tourism (Italian)
 Parco d'Abruzzo description (Italian)
 BGCI entry
 Horti entry

Botanical gardens in Italy
Gardens in Abruzzo
1984 establishments in Italy